This timeline lists important events relevant to the life of George Kastrioti Skanderbeg (6 May 1405 – 17 January 1468), widely known as Skanderbeg.

1405 
 May 6George was born in one of the two villages owned by his grandfather Pal Kastrioti, in Debar region (now along the border between Albania and North Macedonia). He was a member of the Kastrioti family. George's father was John Castriot (an Ottoman vassal since 1385) and mother Vojsava Tripalda. Skanderbeg's parents had nine children, of whom he was the youngest son, his older brothers were Stanisha, Reposh and Kostandin, and his sisters were Mara, Jelena, Angjelina, Vlajka and Mamica.

1409 
 John Castriot sent his eldest son, Stanisha, to be the Sultan's hostage.

1423 
 John Castriot sent George as a hostage to the sultan's court.
 Skanderbeg was circumcised.
 George soon won the Sultan's confidence and was treated by Murad like his own son and promoted him to the high ranks in the Ottoman Army.

14231425 
 Ottomans gave Skanderbeg a military education in Enderun in Edirne.

1426 
 The First act of Hilandar emerged as a document written on Serbian language and Cyrillic script which is the first written document that contains the name of George Kastriot.
 In period between 1426 and 1431 John Castriot and his three sons (Stanisha, Reposh and George) purchased four adelphates (rights to reside on monastic territory and receive subsidies from monastic resources) to the Saint George tower of Hilandar and to some property within the monastery as stated in the Second Act of Hilandar.

1428 
 Stefan Maramonte went to Ottoman court and met Skanderbeg there.
 Based on the Ottoman graduation system, the sultan granted Skanderbeg a timar. This timar was near to the territories controlled by his father Gjon Kastrioti.
 April — John Castriot sent a letter to Venice in which he had explained his concerns that his son Skanderbeg would probably be ordered by the sultan to occupy his territory.
 John Castriot had to seek forgiveness from the Venetian Senate because of Skanderbeg's participation in Ottoman military campaigns against Christians.

1430 
 John Castriot was defeated in a battle by the Ottoman governor of Skopje, Isa bey Evrenos and as a result, his territorial possessions were extremely reduced.
 Skanderbeg gained the title of sipahi because of his merits in expeditions of Murad II.

1431 
 July 31Skanderbeg's brother Reposh died as a monk in Mount Athos where he was buried.

1432—1436 
 Although Skanderbeg was summoned home by his relatives when George Arianiti and Andrew Thopia with other chiefs from region between Vlorë and Shkodër organized rebellion against Ottoman Empire in period 1432—1436, he did nothing, remaining loyal to the sultan.
 Skanderbeg commanded Ottoman cavalry in many different battles in Europe and Asia bringing slaves and loot to Ottoman capitol Adrianople. According to Fan Noli, during one battle in Anatolia he first climbed to the wall, raised Ottoman flag and was first among the Ottoman forces to enter the besieged fortress.

1437 
 4 MayJohn Castriot died in Mount Athos anf buried in his tower (Arbanska pirg/Albanian tower)
 Skanderbeg expected that he would succeed his father and became the lord of the Kastiotis's domain.
 Skanderbeg's expectations were not met. Ottomans annexed John's former domain and appointed Skanderbeg as timariot of a timar composed of nine villages in high mountains which until John's death belonged to his domain.
 Skanderbeg became subaşi of the Krujë Subaşilik of the Sanjak of Albania in period 1437–1438.
 NovemberHizir bey was appointed as subaşi of the Krujë Subaşilik instead of Skanderbeg.

1438 
 Skanderbeg continued fighting within Ottoman forces.
 MaySkanderbeg's timar (of the vilayet of Dhimitër Jonima) composed of nine villages in high mountains that once belonged to his father John (this timar was listed in Ottoman registers as John's land, Turkish: Yuvan-ili) was awarded to Andre Karlo.
 The granting of these villages to André Karlo must have upset Skanderbeg who requested to be granted with control over the zeamet in Misia consisting of his father's former domain. Sanjakbey (probably of the Sanjak of Ohrid) objected Skanderbeg's request.

1439 
 7 JulyA letter from Skanderbeg and widow of John Castriot was presented by their procurator priest Petar to the Dubrovnik's city council. The letter was written in Slavic language and contained their request to inherit 123 ducats two merchants from Dubrovnik owed to John Castriot for customs they did not pay on time. Their request was accepted.

1440 
 Skanderbeg was appointed as sanjakbey of the Sanjak of Dibra.

1443 
 August 1443George Arianiti again rebelled against Ottomans, probably urged by pope Eugene IV or instigated by the news of defeat of Hadım Şehabeddin.
 Early November 1443Skanderbeg participated in the Battle of Niš fighting for Ottoman Empire under Kasim Pasha against allied forces of John Hunyadi, Władysław III of Poland and Đurađ Branković.
 Early November 1443After the Ottoman forces were defeated in the Battle of Niš, Skanderbeg forced an Ottoman scribe to forge a letter in which sultan Murad II appoints Skanderbeg as the Governor of Krujë. According to some earlier sources, Skanderbeg deserted the Ottoman army during the Battle of Kunovica on 2 January 1444.
 November 28 Together with his nephew Hamza Kastrioti and 300 Ottoman soldiers from Albania Skanderbeg arrived to Krujë and used the forged letter to gain the control of Krujë from Zabel Pasha.
 Soon after Skanderbeg captured Krujë his rebels managed to capture many Ottoman fortresses including strategically very important Svetigrad (Kodžadžik) taken with support of Moisi Arianit Golemi and 3,000 rebels from Debar.
 According to some sources Skanderbeg impaled captured Ottoman soldiers who refused to be baptized into Christianity.

1444 
 March 2A meeting of local regional noblemen from Albania was organized in the Venetian town Lezhë, Albania Veneta. They agreed to establish an alliance (League of Lezhë) to fight under Skanderbeg's command against the Ottoman Empire.
 June 29Skanderbeg was victorious against the Ottoman forces in the Battle of Torvioll.
 Skanderbeg's forces stole cattle of the citizens of Lezhë and captured their women and children.
 November 10After winning the Battle of Varna against crusaders of John Hunyadi, sultan Murad II attempted to convince Skanderbeg to return under Ottoman suzerainty. Skanderbeg refused.
 Nicholas Dukagjini, ambushed and killed another League member, Lekë Zaharia Altisferi.
 Dukagjini's attempt to capture Zaharia's fortress Dagnum failed.
 Zaharia's mother ceded to Venice fortress of Dagnum and all other possessions which belonged to her murdered son Zaharia (Drivast, Sati, Gladri and Dushmani).

1445 
 February 12Venetian Republic senate confirmed to Skanderbeg and to his brother Staniša that Venice will have the same obligations toward two of them as they had toward their father, promising them Venetian citizenship and safe conduct in case their enemies drive them away.
 October 10Skanderbeg and his forces were victorious in the Battle of Mokra, fought on the mountain of Mokra in Macedonia.

1446 
 Spring Through Ragusan diplomats Skanderbeg requested help from the Pope and Kingdom of Hungary to struggle against the Ottomans.
 September 27Skanderbeg was victorious in the Battle of Otonetë (north of Debar, Macedonia).
 Gjergj Arianiti allied with the Kingdom of Naples.

1447 
 Skanderbeg was seduced by Alfonso V into making a war against Venice.
 Skanderbeg's envoys visited Serbian Despot Đurađ Branković. Branković gave them cordial reception and informed them that he wish to see people from Albania to capture Dagnum from Venetians. Branković, an Ottoman vassal and lord of Serbian Despotate, promised to help Skanderbeg to fight against the Venetian Republic.
 Skanderbeg proclaimed himself the heir of the Balšići and emphasized his intention of gaining control of their former domains.
 Skanderbeg claimed to Venice all their towns which were pronoia of murdered Lekë Zaharia Altisferi (Dagnum, Drivast, Sati, Gladri and Dushmani) and also Drivast because it belonged to Serbian Despotate before Venice captured it.
 Venice refused Skanderbeg's claim and offered him 1,000 ducats to lay aside all claims.
 Skanderbeg refused Venetian offer.
 Skanderbeg attacked Durrës.
 Skanderbeg failed to capture Venetian towns Bar and Ulcinj after unsuccessful attacks he conducted on behalf of the Kingdom of Naples together with forces of Serbian Despotate led by Đurađ Branković and forces of Principality of Zeta led by Stefan Crnojević.
 DecemberSkanderbeg besieged Dagnum, but failed to capture it.
 DecemberSkanderbeg's forces reconstructed Baleč fortress and established a garrison of 2,000 men in it with Marin Spani as its commander
 DecemberVenetian forces (led also by Andrija and Kojčin Humoj, together with Simeon Vulkata) drove away Skanderbeg's forces from Baleč garrison.
 DecemberSkanderbeg plundered area around Durrës.

1448 
 March 4The Venetian Empire offered a life pension of 100 golden ducats annually for the person who would kill Skanderbeg.
 Skanderbeg sent a detachment of his troops to the rural areas of the Kingdom of Naples to suppress a rebellion against Alfonso V. Many of them settled there.
 AprilSkanderbeg's forces besieged Durrës and he requested from its citizens annual provision of 400 ducats and two clothing. Citizens of Durrës were willing to accept his request but Senate later rejected such idea because they believed separate peaces would divide weak Venetian forces in area between Durrës and Kotor.
 MayThe Venetian Senate accepted offers of some people who promised to kill Skanderbeg for a life pension of 100 ducats annually. 
 Venetian Senate sent a messenger to the Ottoman sultan and requested that Skanderbeg should be punished "because Skanderbeg is Ottoman citizen and we have solid peace with Ottoman Empire".
 Ottoman forces under command of Sultan Murad II struggled against Skanderbeg with limited results recapturing only a part of the Skanderbeg's territory.
 Murad mobilized two armies to attack Skanderbeg. One army of 10,000 cavalry led by Ali Feriz Pasha who was supreme commander of the European Ottoman forces and another of 15,000 cavalry and infantry under command of Mustapha Pasha.
 JuneIn action coordinated with Skanderbeg, the lord of Serbian Despotate attacked Venetian towns in the region of Kotor, Budva and Bar.
 Because Ottoman forces attacked Skanderbeg Venetians were not concerned about him anymore. They decided not to make peace with him but to destroy him and noblemen allied with him. Therefore, Venetians decided not to allow them to find refugee in their towns. In the same time Venetians opened gates of their cities for peasants to flee from Ottomans leaving Skanderbeg and noblemen allied with him without supplies provided by those peasants.
 July 23Skanderbeg was victorious near Shkodër, against Venetian force of 15,000 men under the command of Daniele Iurichi, governor of Scutari.
 July 31Skanderbeg lost Svetigrad to Ottoman Empire after the siege (May 14 – July 31).
 Skanderbeg's forces under command of Hamza Kastrioti were defeated after they attacked the Venetian fortress near Dagnum.
 Murad II abandoned his campaign after receiving the news about preparation for the new Crusade.
 August 14Skanderbeg was victorious in the Battle of Oranik (near modern-day Debar, North Macedonia).
 September 19 The fire devastated Scutari, damaged city walls and killed around 500 people. This reduced defense potential of the city and increased danger of Skanderbeg's attacks.
 When Venetian Senate received news that Serbian Despot prepares another attack on their positions in Zeta. On October 19 Senate issued instructions to Scutari governor to sign a peace treaty with Skanderbeg or to destroy his forces if he refuses the peace. This instructions were late because the governor of Scutari already signed a treaty with Skanderbeg 15 days earlier.
 October 4Skanderbeg signed the capitulation to the Venice in Shkodër (disguised as peace treaty). Venice was obliged to pay 1,400 dukats annually to Skanderbeg, but never paid it. Skanderbeg was also obliged to join an anti-Ottoman coalition led by John Hunyadi.
 Skanderbeg asked Republic of Ragusa for a loan to be able to fight against Ottomans. He gave hawks to the Ragusan senate as his gift.
 Ragusan Senate rejected Skanderbeg's request and granted him 200 ducats. 
 Hunyadi was defeated in the battle on Kosovo on 17–20 October while Skanderbeg failed to collect enough supplies to finance his forces to join Hunyadi's campaign. It was believed that he was delayed by Đurađ Branković, then allied with Sultan Murad II, whose land Skanderbeg and his forces ravaged as punishment for desertion of Christian cause.
 On a session held on November 14 Senate decided what to do with hawks presented by Skanderbeg.

1449 
 By 1449 Gjergj Arianiti left his alliance with Skanderbeg.
 Skanderbeg tried to regain Svetigrad but failed.
 Skanderbeg and Arianiti approached to Venetians requesting their protection. Venetians opted for neutral approach, not to jeopardize peace with Ottomans, and refused their request.
 AprilSkanderbeg offered 6,000 ducats to gain the status of protectorate of the Republic of Venice. The same amount he was obliged to pay to the Ottoman Empire as its vassal after he was forced to submit to Ottoman suzerainty. Venetians refused Skanderbeg's offers and informed him that they "don't want property that belongs to somebody else" while emphasizing their willingness to help Skanderbeg to negotiate peace with Ottomans.* Skanderbeg supported Venetian appointment of Ivan Crnojević as Duke.
 Skanderbeg asked Venice to allow him to graze his cattle on Venetian territory (villages Medoa and Vilipoje). Venice allowed him to do so.
 Skanderbeg sent another detachment of troops to Italy, to garrison Sicily against a rebellion and invasion. This time the troops were led by brothers Giorgio and Basilio Reres, sons of Demetrios.

1450 
 Skanderbeg sends a letter to Ragusa to inform its nobility that Ottoman sultan was going to attack him.
 Skanderbeg organized a beginning of the construction of Rodoni Castle.
 League of Lezhë collapsed when Ottoman forces approached.
 Skanderbeg left Krujë before it was besieged.
 May 14The Ottoman siege of Krujë began.
 Arianiti begged Venetians to work on peace between Sultan and Skanderbeg if Ottomans would not capture Krujë.
 October 14Skanderbeg offered Krujë to the Venetians, threatening to capitulate the fortress to the Ottomans if they did not accept it.
 October 26Murad lifted the siege of Krujë.
 The Venetians replied to Skanderbeg's offer rejecting it and offered to help Skanderbeg to harmonize his relationship with Ottomans
 The peace was agreed between Ottomans and Skanderbeg who again obliged himself to pay tribute to the sultan.
 Skanderbeg was at the end of his resources. He lost all of his possessions except Krujë. Other Albanian nobles allied with Murad like he saved them from the oppression. After the Ottoman withdrawal they continued to struggle against Skanderbeg's efforts to enforce his authority.
 Skanderbeg travelled to Ragusa to urge for and to collect Ragusans' and pope's financial support.

1451 
 JanuarySkanderbeg was appointed as "captain general of the king of Aragon"
 3 FebruarySultan Murad II dies and Mehmed the Conqueror began his reign. He had in mind much bigger plans than capture of Kruje. He planned to capture Byzantine held Constantinople. After the dissolution of the League of Lezhe, not being aware of new Ottoman plans, Skanderbeg believed he was forced to seeks external assistance.
 26 March Skanderbeg got external assistance by signing the Treaty of Gaeta and recognizing suzerainty of the Kingdom of Naples.
 End of MayNeapolitan military officer Bernat Vaquer, sent by Alphonso v with one hundred infantry soldiers, took over Kruje on behalf of the Kingdom of Naples and put its garrison under his command.
  Pal Dukagjini and Peter Spani remained aligned with Venice and established friendly relations with the Sultan.
 April 21Skanderbeg married Donika Kastrioti, daughter of Gjergj Arianiti in an Eastern Orthodox Ardenica Monastery.
 Venice continued its efforts to turn Skanderbeg's allies against Kingdom of Naples and Skanderbeg. George Arianiti cut himself off from Albanian politics while Paul Dukagjini, member of Dukagjini Family and father of Lekë Dukagjini, however, prepared for war against Skanderbeg.

1452 
 23 — 25 AprilAlphonso V appointed Ramon d'Ortafa as governor of Kruje and Albania. He also informed Johan de Castro, a castellan of Kruje at that time, about this appointment and ordered him to hand over Kruje to d'Ortafa. Alphonso V sent letters to Skanderbeg, George Arianiti and other tribal leaders in Albania to inform them about appointment of d'Ortafa and to instruct them to accept his governance.
 Rodoni Castle has been constructed.
 SpringGiammaria Biemmi claims that Dukagjini attempted to kill Skanderbeg in the spring of 1452. It is not possible to confirm this claim which is supported by some scholars as well as information that Skanderbeg and Dukagjini made peace on 25 September 1452.
 July 21Skanderbeg was victorious in Battle of Modrica and Battle of Meçad where his forces killed Tahip Pasha and captured Hamza Pasha who was ransomed for 13,000 dukats.
 JulyDukagjini opted for a reconciliation with Skanderbeg.
 AutumnSkanderbeg sent his troops to aid the Venetians thwart the attack of Serbian Despotate on the Venetian city of Cattaro.

1453 
 March 5Alfonso sent a letter censuring Venice for not paying its dues to Skanderbeg and also for supporting Skanderbeg's enemies. He thus urged for a peremptory measure to all AlbanianVenetian conflicts.
 April 22Skanderbeg was victorious in the Battle of Polog fought near modern-day Tetovo in North Macedonia.
 Alfonso promised to send men and an annual pension of 1,500 ducats to Skanderbeg, whereas Pope Nicholas V sent 5,000 florins.
 September 18Venetians sent a letter to Skanderbeg expressing their gratitude for his willingness to help them to negotiate peace with Serbian despot.
 September 25Ragusa has decided to give deposits of Stefan Branković to Skanderbeg's envoys.
 9 OctoberVenetian Senate informs Skanderbeg that his request to be accompanied by the Venetian governor of Alessio during his trip to Rome and Naples has been accepted.
 6 December Alphonso V assured Pedro Skuder, castellan of Kruje, that Kruje will be delivered necessary supplies.

1454 
 Ramon d’Ortafà minted coins in Kruje.
 Skanderbeg signed peace treaty with Dukagjini Family after many years of skirmishes between them.
 October 9Venetian Senate allowed governor of Alessio Petro Marcello to accompany Skanderbeg during his travel to Italy.
 October 21Alphonso V from his Castel Nuovo writes to Skanderbeg that Paul Dukagjini sent his envoys and declared his loyalty and vassalage to the Kingdom of Naples. Based on that Alphonso V awarded Paul Dukagjini with 300 ducats of annual provisions.
 In a letter brought to Alphonso V by Paolo Cuccia, Skanderbeg requested support for attack on Ottoman held Berat.

1455 
 JulySkanderbeg's forces (supported with strong contingent of Neapolitans from Alphonso V) were badly defeated when they failed to capture Berat during the Siege of Berat. Muzaka Thopia was killed in the battle while Golemi deserted to the Ottomans

1456 
 end of MarchSkanderbeg was victorious in the Battle of Oranik where he defeated his former companion, Golemi; the latter allied himself with the Ottomans.
 AprilGolemi returned to Skanderbeg and joined his forces
 By MayGjergj Arianiti allied with Venice.
 Venice appointed Gjergj Arianiti on the position of captain of the Venetian Albania, which additionally weakened Skanderbeg's cause.
 According to Fan Noli, Gjergj Stress Balsha, sold the fortress of Modrič to the Ottomans for 30,000 silver ducats. He tried to cover up the act; however, his treason was discovered and he was sent to prison in Naples.
 November 4According to the reports sent to Duchy of Milan, Skanderbeg helped Leke Dukagjini to capture Venetian held Dagnum.
 November 9According to one report Venetians had intention to attack Skanderbeg because he was a supporter of Alfonso V of Aragon to whom he granted Kruje, so Skanderbeg's men have to go all the way to Venetian held Durazo or Scutari if they want to fight against Ottomans.
 Skanderbeg's son Gjon was born.
 Hamza Kastrioti, Skanderbeg's own nephew and his close collaborator, defected to the Ottomans.

1457 
 JunePelinović brought to Venice Skanderbeg's letter in which he complained because Venetians were not regularly paying him the agreed provisions.
 In the name of Skanderbeg, Pelinović went in a diplomatic mission to Pope Callixtus III and convinced him to continue with the payments of his allowances to Skanderbeg.
 JulySkanderbeg requested from Venetians to allow his forces to cross Venetian territory because they wanted to attack Ottoman positions in Upper Zeta. Senate refused his request.
 AugustVenetians recaptured Dagnum from Leke Dukagjini after fierce battle and significant casualties. Venetian forces led by Andrea Venier were supported by Skanderbeg.
 September 2Skanderbeg was victorious in the Battle of Albulena. He captured Hamza Kastrioti and sent him to prison to the Kingdom of Naples in which he eventually died.

1458 
 June 27Alfonso V died.
 Skanderbeg accepted Ottoman suzerainty.
 July 27According to some reports, Ottoman Empire captured Albanian mountains and Skanderbeg came to Kruje with 200 soldiers awarded to him by Ferdinand I of Naples. Venetian commander of Kruje garrison was supposedly afraid that Skanderbeg would surrender Kruje to the Ottomans and did not allow him to enter the castle. Skanderbeg returned to Alessio and some rumors say that he intend to approach to Hungarian king for help.

1459 
 2 April Skanderbeg wrote receipt on Serbian language in which he confirms that he collected 500 ducats from his deposit in Ragusa.
 7 June Skanderbeg sends to Ragusans another letter written in Old Church Slavonic which he informed them that they should receive his envoy Ninac Vukoslavić who was sent to seek their help.
 13 June Skanderbeg sends Serbian language letter to Ragusans informing them that he collected 900—1,000 ducats out of his deposit
 JuneSkanderbeg ceded the fortress Sati to Venice in order to establish cordial relation with Venice before sending his forces to Italy to help Ferrante I of Naples who had been suffering a dynastic dispute after the death of Alfonso V. Before Venetians took over the control over Sati, Skanderbeg captured it and surrounding area driving Lekë Dukagjini and his forces away, because he opposed to Skanderbeg and destroyed Sati before Venetian takeover.
 Although Skanderbeg had intention to accept the Ottoman proposal for the three year armistice, the pope did not allow him and he had to refuse it. To show his discontent Skanderbeg refused to participate in the Council of Mantua held to plan the future crusade.

1460 
 Skanderbeg sent his nephew, Constantine Kastrioti, with 500 cavalry to Barletta, to struggle for Ferrante I of Naples.
 Skanderbeg appointed Đorđe Pelinović, abbot of Ratac Abbey, as his procurator.
 In mid-1460 dethroned Serbian Despot Stefan Branković came to Albania to visit his relatives. Skanderbeg gave to Stefan Branković an unknown estate to support dethroned Serbian Despot. Stefan married Angelina, the sister of Donika, who married Skanderbeg.

1461 
 At the beginning of 1461 Stefan Branković went to Italy with Skanderbeg's written recommendation. According to some sources Stefan stayed in Albania until 1466. Stefan stayed with Skanderbeg and supported his anti-Ottoman struggle forging plans to recapture Serbia and Smederevo from Ottomans. 
 April - Ragusan Senate promised Skanderbeg safe haven from Ottomans in case he would need one.
 Mid JuneSkanderbeg agreed to a ceasefire with Mehmed which was agreed to last for three years. This ceasefire was more favorable to the Ottomans than to Skanderbeg's forces.
 Skanderbeg went to Italy to join his nephew in struggle for Ferrante I.

1462 
 Venice stopped paying provisions to Skanderbeg and this brought Venice near armed conflict with Skanderbeg.
 AprilVenetian Senate wrote to Scutari governor to calm Skanderbeg using Pelinović as mediator. Pelinović was successful and Venetian Senate continued with the payments (600 ducats totally per year) to Skanderbeg and agreed to pay him all retained provisions.
 July 7Skanderbeg was victorious in the Battle of Mokra against the Ottoman forces led by Sinan bey.
 AugustSkanderbeg was victorious in three battles against the Ottomans during his Macedonian campaign in only one month:
 in Mokra against the forces led by Hasan bey.
 in Pollog against the forces led by Isuf bey.
 in Livad against the forces led by Karaza bey.

1463 
 April 26Venetians allowed Skanderbeg and his forces to cross the territory of Venetian domains to support Stjepan Vukčić Kosača. but Skanderbeg failed to carry out his promises for help.
 April 27Skanderbeg signed the Peace of Ushkub, a peace treaty with the Ottoman Empire. This peace treaty was more favorable to the Ottomans than to Skanderbeg's forces.
 Skanderbeg's envoy Andrija Snaticho, an abbot of Ratac Abbey came to Venice to offer an alliance on behalf of Skanderbeg.
 August 1Venetian Senate decided to send an envoy ("unus nobilis orator") to make peace between Stjepan Kosača and his son Vladislav and between Skanderbeg and neighboring noblemen.
 August 20Skanderbeg signed a treaty of alliance with Republic of Venice and based on this treaty he fought as ally of Venice during the Ottoman–Venetian War until his death.
 September 25Venetian Senate accepts Skanderbeg's son John Castriot II as Venetian nobleman, a member of the Great Council of Venice.
 October 15Paladin Gundulić concluded a contract on behalf of Skanderbeg with a couple of craftsmen to build a ship for Skanderbeg on the territory of Albania. They were paid in advance, under condition not to return from Albania until they build a ship.
 NovemberPope proclaimed his intention to organize the crusade against Ottoman Empire with Skanderbeg as one of its main leaders.
 Lekë Dukagjini accepted to participate in the crusade only after pope's intervention.

1464 
 Spring - Envoys of Stefan Branković and Skanderbeg together visited pope and requested his help for struggle against the Ottomans and for Branković's return to Smederevo. 
 September 14 or 15Skanderbeg and his Venetian allies were victorious in the Battle of Ohrid against the forces of Şeremet bey, sanjakbey of the Sanjak of Ohrid.
 SeptemberSkanderbeg besieged Ohrid but failed to capture it.

1465 
 AprilSome of Skanderbeg's most trusted men were captured by the Ottoman forces under command of Ballaban Badera, a new sanjakbey of the Sanjak of Ohrid, during the Battle of Vaikal. They were executed after being tortured for 15 days.
 JuneSkanderbeg defeated Ottoman forces led by Ballaban Badera in the Battle of Meçad, near Oranik in Upper Dibra, Macedonia.
 AugustSkanderbeg defeated Ottoman forces led by Ballaban Badera in another Battle of Vaikal, near Oranik.
 AugustSkanderbeg defeated Ottoman forces led by Jakup Arnauti in the Battle of Kashari

1466 
 JuneThe siege of Krujë began with Skanderbeg being outside of the Krujë.
 JulyElbasan Castle has been constructed by the Ottoman Empire.
 JulySkanderbeg supported Venetian appointment of Ivan Crnojević as Duke.
 August 14The Venetian senate requested from Skanderbeg to attack Elbasan Castle (with help of the forces of Venetian provveditori of Albania).
 Skanderbeg's attempt to capture Elbasan ended in failure.
 Skanderbeg retreated to Rodoni Castle from where he and his family, together with many people from Albania, were transported to Brindisi in 14 ships.
 Dorotheos, the Archbishop of Ohrid and his clerks and boyars were expatriated to Istanbul in 1466 probably because of their anti-Ottoman activities during Skanderbeg's rebellion.
 OctoberBy the end of October, Skanderbeg began his voyage to Italy while Krujë remained under the siege.
 November 2Ragusan senate issued a decree which instructed three noblemen to inform Skanderbeg not to enter the territory of Ragusa.
 December 12Skanderbeg reached Rome. According to eyewitnesses he came in poverty, with only a few horses.
 DecemberPope gave 300 ducats to Skanderbeg to support his stay in Rome and offered him lodging in Palazzo Venezia but Skanderbeg decided to stay at his friend's house which was in the same square.
 December 25Pope Paul II invited Skanderbeg to a ceremony where he was awarded with a sword and helmet.

1467 
 January 7Together with pope Skanderbeg attended to a consistory and discussed the pope's unsuccessful appeal to fund Skanderbeg with 5,000 ducats.
 February 14Skanderbeg departed from Rome.
 February and March
 Skanderbeg visited Ferdinand I of Naples who granted him 1,500 ducats and 300 carts of grain.
 Ferdinand I of Naples and Ottoman ambassador signed peace treaty.
 Skanderbeg left the court of Ferdinand I and returned to Albania.
 Spring
 Skanderbeg met with Giosafat Barbaro in Scutari, the Venetian provveditore in Albania Veneta, and gathered help from Venetian nobles.
 Skanderbeg met with Dukagjini and other northern Albanian nobles in Alessio (Lezhë) where once distant Albanian nobles, together with lukewarm Dukagjini, allied themselves with Skanderbeg to assault Ballaban's forces.
 April 23Skanderbeg entered Krujë.
 SpringSkanderbeg attacked Elbassan but his attempt to capture it failed. He only managed to laid waste the lower city, but its citadel defied to the assaults of Skanderbeg's forces.
 SummerOttoman sultan Mehmed II besieged Kruje while Ottoman grand vizier Mahmud Pasha Angelović pursued Skanderbeg who fled to the seacoast.
 Ottoman forces destroyed Rodoni castle. Ottomans plundered territory of Albania taking many people into slavery. Skanderbeg's forces were near their end.
 July 28Venetian Senate invites Skanderbeg to defend Scutari, Kruje and Durazzo while Venice would provide armies and funds.
 According to some reports, Skanderbeg and his forces supported by Venetian fleet, rejected an Ottoman attempt to capture Durazzo.

1468 
 JanuarySkanderbeg attempted to organize a meeting of the local noblemen in Lezhë.
 January 17Skanderbeg died of malaria in Lezhë, Republic of Venice. He is buried there in Saint Nicholas Church.
 February 24King of Naples ordered to inform Skanderbeg's widow and son that he will award them a ship and accept them in his kingdom.

References

Bibliography

Further reading

 
 
 

Personal timelines
 Timeline
Albania history-related lists